South Texas International Airport at Edinburg  is in Hidalgo County, Texas, ten miles north of Edinburg. It received its name in July 2007, prior to which it was Edinburg International Airport.

Most U.S. airports use the same three-letter location identifier for the FAA and IATA, but this airport is EBG to the FAA and has no IATA code.

Facilities
In the year ending September 29, 2005 the airport had 4,800 general aviation aircraft operations, average 13 per day.

References

External links 

 

Airports in Texas
Buildings and structures in Edinburg, Texas
Buildings and structures in Hidalgo County, Texas
Transportation in Hidalgo County, Texas
Edinburg, Texas